Lorenzo Fonda (born 1979) is an Italian filmmaker and multi-media artist and artist based in Italy. He is recognized for his eclectic use of multi-media techniques and often surreal storytelling. He became a naturalized United States citizen in 2021.

His works include feature films, commercials, music video, short films, interactive installations, illustrations and murals. He is best known for his collaboration with mural artist and animator Blu, which resulted in the feature-length documentary Megunica, shot in 2006 across Mexico, Guatemala, Nicaragua, Costa Rica and Argentina. During the production of the film Fonda encouraged Blu to experiment mixing the stop-motion technique and painting, and the first test they created ended up being included in the film. Subsequently, Blu further explored the technique which led to the creation of the groundbreaking film Muto.

Fonda collaborated with Rodney Ascher on his documentary A Glitch in the Matrix, for which he acted as director of animation. The film premiered at the Sundance Film Festival 2021 and was acquired by Magnolia Pictures.

Other works include music videos for bands such as Caribou, Scissor Sisters, Metronomy, Bright Eyes, Jovanotti, Jamie Woon, Bernhard Fleischmann, For a Minor Reflection and others, as well creating ads for companies such as Nike, Alfa Romeo, San Diego Zoo and Converse. Aside from his commercial works, he directed PSAs for The Humane Society of the United States, National Geographic Channel, Boys & Girls Clubs and World AIDS Day. He created a series of station identifications for MTV, entitled 'MTV: The Art of M." These included "Ice Cream," with production design by Mathery.

In 2008 he crossed the Pacific Ocean aboard the cargo ship Portland Senator, and he made a film about the experience titled Ten things I have learned about the sea.

Fonda is currently working on a project revolving around a skateboarding session on the biggest modern sculpture in the world, Il Cretto di Burri.

Filmography

Feature Length

 A Glitch in the Matrix (as Director of Animation) - documentary - (2021)
 Archaeology of the future - documentary - (in production)
 Megunica - documentary - (2008)

Other works
 "The Brick Wall" - 2018 - (personal short film)
"The Sound of Heat" - 2011 - (commissioned by MOCA Los Angeles)
 "WARP20 NYC" - (medium-length documentary, commissioned by Warp Records) - 2010
 "Ten things I have learned about the sea" - (personal short) - 2008
 "King of Empty" - (part of PSST! Pass it on project) - 2008
 "Blu + ERICAILCANE - (personal short film) - 2007
 "BIFF opener" - (commissioned by Boston International Film Festival) - 2007

Awards
 2009 Taiwan International Documentary Festival - Special Merit Prize
 DOC/Fest Sheffield Documentary Film Festival - Grierson Youth Jury Prize Nominee
 Amsterdam International Film Festival 2008 - Best Creative Documentary
 Officinema festival - Concorso Iceberg - Best Documentary

References

External links
 Lorenzo Fonda's personal website
 
 Megunica documentary official website
 Archaeology of the future documentary official website
 Interview with JVC Adixxion Lab
 Interview with Wired Magazine blog
 Interview with The Atlantic about Megunica
 Interview with The Atlantic about Ten things I have learned about the sea
 Interview with Submarine Channel
 Interview with Portable.tv
 Interview with Flux Collective
 Interview with LA I'm Yours
 Interview with Evilmonito
 Interview with House of Peroni

1979 births
Italian artists
Italian film directors
Living people